The athletics competition in the 1938 Central American and Caribbean Games were held in Panama City, Panama. It was the first time women's events were included.

Medal summary

Men's events

Women's events

Medal table

References

 
 
 

Athletics at the Central American and Caribbean Games
Central American and Caribbean Games
1938 in Panama
1938 Central American and Caribbean Games